Lars Graugaard (born Copenhagen, 10 February 1957) is a Danish composer, of contemporary classical music and a laptop performer of  improvised music and experimental techno music.

Musical Education
After studying composition with Niels Viggo Bentzon and flute performance with Poul Birkelund among others as well as supplementary studies with Michel Debost at The Royal Danish Academy of Music 1977–1983, Graugaard graduated in 1983 with an MA in flute performance. In the early 80s he briefly sought compositional advice from leading Danish composers before pursuing self-guided studies in composition and other forms of musical creation. He received a PhD from Oxford Brookes University in 2006 with his dissertation Gesture And Emotion In Interactive Music - Artistic And Technological Challenges, under the supervision of Robert Rowe and Paul Dibley.

Main activities
Since 1983 Graugaard has worked as a free-lance composer and flute performer, later laptop performer. The recipient of numerous commissions and scholarships, he has composed 4 operas and 14 works for large orchestra as well as a large number of works for solo instruments, chamber groups and voice. Since 2005 he performs realtime electronic music that he generates by means of his own computer code, either solo or in small settings with experienced improvisers.

In 1997–99 he was composer-in-residence with Odense Symphony Orchestra and in 1997–2004 he was professor of interactive music at the Danish National Academy of Music. He lectured 2003–08 at Aalborg University's Department of Media Technology and he was Visiting Scholar at Iceland Academy of the Arts's Music Department 2008–11. In 2010 he became Visiting Faculty Artist at New York University Department for Music and Performing Arts Professions, and 2013–2015 he was composer-in-residence with Grup Instrumental de València.

Since 2000 he has been invited to guest lecture across the world including the universities at Stanford, Columbia, Boston and UC San Diego as well as Juilliard School of Music, Jerusalem Academy of Music and Dance, Université Paris, Rotterdam Conservatory and Sibelius Academy (Helsinki). In 2000 he was professor at ACOF Young Composers’ Orchestra Workshop held in Australia and in 2004 he taught at June In Buffalo. He was a jury member of the Hong Kong Composers’ Guild Competition 2010. Graugaard was artistic director of the ISCM World Music Days 1996, ICMC 2007 and the re-new digital arts festival 2008–2013. In 2013 he initiated the clang record label as a distribution platform for like-minded producers and composers.

Style and technique of composition
Lars Graugaard is a prolific and chameleon-like pioneer with a background in musical styles that include classical, contemporary, improvised and urban. Initiated in the booming 70s’ hippie scene, he quickly turned to a wider notion of musical creation in performance and composition. While studying flute performance at the Royal Academy of Music he would undertake self-guided studies of musical scores and collaborate with a vast array of artists well versed in improvisation in what could be characterised as ‘practical field studies in the composer/performer amalgam’.

In the late 80s he experimented with the computer as a compositional aid, but quickly shifted to using it for realtime music interaction, producing pieces such as Timid Souls (1989/90) and Incrustations (1994). In the early 90s he developed his current compositional technique of ‘intuitive constructivism’ where short, intense time-spans of sonic conception allows for unencumbered composing that by nature preclude any subsequent revisions. The first works with this method were River and Leaf (1991/92), The Circle And The Web (1992) and the orchestra work Sated Bodies (1993/94), whereas emphasis on pulsations combined with time-bound elasticity that harks back to his musical initiation in the 70s became apparent for the first time in Black Walls (1995).

The deepening of his knowledge of music information technology resulted among other in three interactive operas premiered between 2001 and 2006. During the 00s he gradually stopped playing the flute and focused on the computer as his self-styled performance vehicle. This resulted in an increased presence of elements from adventurous urban music that, now within a comprehensive, compositional outlook, brought him full-circle to his 70s experimental, performative roots. Further refining his score music, he has since the late 00s used empirical studies from cognitive musicology into the correlates between emotion and score notation to guide musical discourse and development. This allows him to preserve his compositional materials and procedures, while at the same time attending the music's expressive dimension, as manifested in works such as Three Places (2011), Venus (2013) and Engage And Share (2014).

About the performances
Graugaard's orchestra works and other compositions have been performed throughout the world, in North and South America, Europe, Asia and Australia. His compositions are published by Pathos Publishing apart from the earlier works that are published by Edition S and Engstrøm & Sødring, both of Copenhagen.

His compositions have been premiered at festivals throughout the world, such as the Cervantino, Nordic Music Days, :de:Aspekte Salzburg, Gulbenkian Festival, Ultima Oslo Contemporary Music Festival, ENSEMS, Iceland Arts Festival and Dark Music Days. His orchestral pieces have been performed by symphony orchestras in Denmark (Royal Danish Orchestra, Odense Symphony Orchestra, Aarhus Symphony Orchestra, Aalborg Symphony Orchestra), the US (NYU Symphony Orchestra), Poland (Filarmónica Pomorska), Australia (Tasmanian Symphony Orchestra), Asia (Hong Kong Philharmonic Orchestra) and Latin America (Orquesta Sinfónica de la Universidad de Guanajuato, Orquesta Filarmónica del Estado de Querétaro, Orquesta Sinfónica de Matanzas, Orquesta de Camara de Chile), with conductors such as David Porcelijn, Sergio Cardenas, :es:Juan Pablo Izquierdo, Maximiano Valdes, :de:Jens Georg Bachmann, Tamás Vető, Thomas Dausgaard, Jan Wagner, and Tsung Yeh. Soloists such as Andras Adorjan, Isabelle Faust, Edgar Guggeis, Lionel Party, Jean-Michel Pilc, Esther Lamneck and Sofia Asunción Claro have performed his works, as have the Icelandic ensemble CAPUT, who commissioned him to write pieces on several occasions.

Since stopping as a flute performer in the mid 00s he has vehemently explored the novel areas of electronic music. He is equally at home in abstract and challenging sonic experiments and effortless, street-smart rhythm designs and this has allowed him develop a very personal take on realtime, electronic music. As an example, implementing aspects of his compositional procedures in computer code has allowed him to use empirical models of pitch sequences  that provide fresh, comprehensible melodic material, progressions, patterns and parametrical sonic effects in electronic performance.

Selected list of works

Operas and other stage works
Trenes De Marzo (2006) - interactive chamber opera in one act
La Quintrala (2003/04) - interactive chamber opera in two acts
Tears of Dionysius (2001/08) - sinfonietta, reciter and video
The Escape (2001/02) - interactive chamber opera in two acts
The Crime (1999) - opera for orchestra, choir and full cast in two acts

Symphony orchestra and chamber orchestra
Venus (2013) - solo violin and double-bass, electronics and orchestra
Milbank's Football (2011) - symphony orchestra
Unto These Yellow Sands (2000) - symphony orchestra
Symphony No. 1 (2000) - symphony orchestra
Shake Off Slumber, And Beware: (2000) - symphony orchestra
Your Shadow, Passing By (1998) - symphony orchestra
To Forget You Is To Forget My Name (1997/98) - solo flute and symphony orchestra
This Is My Blood (1997) - symphony orchestra
The Hand, Unveiled (1996) - solo harp and symphony orchestra
Four Songs – of Desire and Sadness (1995/96) - soprano and symphony orchestra
Sated Bodies (1993/94) - symphony orchestra
Ophelia in the Garden (1989) - solo harp and string orchestra
Resound (1989) - symphony orchestra

Large ensemble
Engage and Share (2014) - sinfonietta
Book of Throws (2001/02) - solo piano and sinfonietta
Blind Lemon (2013) - sinfonietta
Book of Changes (2001/02) - solo wind player and sinfonietta
Book of Motion (1998) - solo percussion and sinfonietta
Body, Legs, Head. (1996)
Double Image (1994) - solo flute and guitar with string orchestra
The Circle And The Web (1992) - sinfonietta

Chamber groups
Tompkins (2013) - clarinet and piano
Three Places (2011) - flute, clarinet, percussion, piano, violin, cello
Bloom (2010/11) - flute, clarinet and piano
Plunge (2005) - flute/piccolo, clarinet, trombone, percussion, piano, viola, cello
Blue Collusion and Entourage (2004) - solo bass-clarinet and flute, oboe, horn, marimba, violin, viola, cello, double-bass
Smeared (2003) - solo accordion and clarinet, piano, percussion, violin, viola, cello, double-bass
Undercurrents (2002) - flute, clarinet, viola, piano
Dislocated (2001/02) - violin, horn, piano
Traps & Lies (1999) - saxophone quartet
Black Walls (1995) - flute, clarinet, piano, violin, cello
Tongues Enrobed (1995) - bass flute, guitar, piano, timpani, violin, cello
Broken Grammar (1995) - harpsichord solo and flute, clarinet, bassoon, violin, viola, cello
River and Leaf (1991/92) - violin solo and flute, clarinet, bassoon, percussion, piano, violin, viola, cello
Five Ruba’iyat (1989) - soprano, flute, guitar, harp

Solo instruments and solo with electronics
Slow Gist (2016) - double-bass and interactive computer
Palpitations (2011) - piano and interactive computer
Quiet Voice (2010) - clarinet and interactive computer
Sparks and Feathers (2010) - violin and interactive computer
Sound Shapes (2008) - harp and interactive computer
Babilu Volati (2008) - voice, visualisation and interactive computer
Behind Your Hands (2003) - accordion and interactive computer
Speak My Mind (2003) - tenor recorder and interactive computer
Concealed Behaviours (2002/03) - bass clarinet and interactive computer
Stretch & Conceal (2002) - piano solo
Spheres to Spikes (2000/01) - accordion solo
Itch (1998) - guitar solo
Calling Angels (1995/96) - clarinet solo
Incrustations (1994) - harp and tape
Timid Souls (1989/90) - flute and tape

The recordings
Graugaard's work as composer and performer is amply represented on recorded media, with over 30 full CDs, vinyls and digital releases to his credit. Since 2009 he has used the recording studio as a way to encapsulate in musical form his performance software's development in a series of commercially available releases. The pieces resulting are edited versions of semi-improvised sessions and each release is a collection of treatments of specific musical challenges and goals. The music has a rich mix of genres and while they suggest Graugaard's origins in the 70s penchant for performative experiments, they are all anchored in the ‘intuitive constructivism' method of his score compositions.

Solo recordings
Persect (2016)
Americanino (2014)
The Yurodny Files (2013)
Red Stuff (2012)
Thump (2011)
Marsism (2010)
Life On Mars? (2009)

Duo and ensemble recordings
What Actually Happened (2016) - Lars Graugaard, Moritz Baumgärtner
Invisible (2016) - Lars Graugaard, Keisuke Matsuno
Rife (2016) - Lars Graugaard, Hans Tammen
Ngelo (2014) - Lars Graugaard, Mikkel Ploug
Fact Machine (2013) - Lars Graugaard, Jean-Michel Pilc
nvmbr (2013) - Lars Graugaard, Keisuke Matsuno
Infernal Machines (2013) - Lars Graugaard, Hans Tammen
Downstream (2012) - Lars Graugaard, NYU Improvisers' Ensemble
We Should Have Turned Left Earlier (2012) - Lars Graugaard, NYU Jazz Composers' Ensemble

References

External links
clang
Discography
List of writings
Cognitive musicology
Official homepage
Academia.edu profile
DaCapo profile
Edition S profile

1957 births
Living people
Danish composers
Danish flautists
Male composers
Alumni of Oxford Brookes University
Royal Danish Academy of Music alumni